Somnio may refer to:

Somnio (yacht), the first "yacht liner"
Infinity Chamber, a 2016 American science fiction film